(or PandaMonium) is an animated television series produced by Studio Kuma, Planet Entertainment and Nelvana, based on the characters created by Taiwanese company TVbean. It was directed by Hideaki Ohba with Hideki Sonoda and Robert Tinkler as series writers. The series first broadcast 19 December 2004 on TTV Main Channel. Its first Japanese broadcast started on Animax on 8 January 2005, followed by Tokyo MX in April 2005. The series premiered in Canada on YTV on 5 July 2006 and is part of the KidSuite package in 2016. Funimation and Nelvana holds the series rights outside Asia, until Funimation's buyout by Sony and the merger with Crunchyroll in 2021 resulting Nelvana to fully handle the series's rights after.

Plot
It follows the story of a fairy named Mi who is sent to Planet Pandasia to warn the residents about a great evil that threatens to destroy Pandasia. She chooses a heroic panda named Toby to defeat King Audie and his minions, Gold and Silver, who want to collect the seven Beans of Power and rid Pandasia of its colourful, beautiful environment and replace it with a dark wasteland.

Characters
Toby (voiced by Julie Lemieux in English) is a shy, clumsy, yet sweet panda, Toby is thrust into a world of adventure when he finds out that he's Pandasia's Chosen One, the Valor Bean Warrior, leader of the seven Pandalian Bean Warriors. The country boy became an employee of Bean TV, thanks to his friend Love, who he seems attracted to (and vice versa). Even though Cool dislikes him at first, Toby works hard to become his friend, and tries to accomplish his job: Saving Pandasia from King Audie and King Kulu!
Didi (voiced by ?) is Toby's tiny yellow dinosaur friend.
Yubby (voiced by Terry McGurrin) is a relative.
Abby (voiced by Dwayne Hill) is a relative.

Mi (voiced by Stephanie Mills in English) is a precocious young fairy. At first, she hates being on Pandasia, and wants to go home, but as the series progresses, she likes being with the Pandalian Warriors, and even refuses to leave when her parents want her to. Her wand carries a magical book that holds all the information she needs, along with the Beans. She is very stubborn, and in the beginning, has a disliking for Cool.
King Panno (voiced by Bill Colgate in English) is Mi's dad
Queen Laila (voiced by ?) is Mi's mom

Cool (voiced by Lyon Smith in English) is an arrogant, self-centered panda, who cares only about himself (and Love). Cool has a great disliking for Toby, and sees him as competition for Love's affection, until Cool finally accepts Toby as his friend. He built his own battle robot, the Pandabot, and his own car, the Coolmobile. In the episode "The Danger Down Deep", Cool is affected by the Desira-Bean. When he falls off a cliff into the sea, his friends think he is dead, when he is really a captive of King Audie. The Desira-Bean transforms him into King Kulu, who takes control of Audie's castle and his minions, turning Audie into a miniature toddler. After his friends find out he is alive, they fight Kulu, trying to save him. Mi finds out about Cool's transformation and tells the others. Cool is then turned back to normal. He is, at first, the Desira-Bean Warrior, but at the end of the show, it is revealed that, he too is the warrior of the Valor-Bean.

Love (also known as Anastasia) is the daughter of Bean TV's owner. She is a very kind young panda, who always cares about others. Though she always seems like a damsel in distress, she is really the warrior of the Adora-Bean. Her compassion towards others makes her a natural when it comes to saving the day. Love has been friends with Cool for a long time, but she didn't seem to return his infatuation with her, and she appeared to have a crush on Toby.

Oscar (voiced by Jamie Watson in English) is the main reporter from Bean TV. He is obsessed with getting the scoop of the century, and will do anything to find it. He likes to put on his special suit and become Panda Hero, and he is the warrior of the Plasma-Bean. Oscar saved Max when they were children. Oscar thinks Bingo and Congo are lazy and self-centered at first, but becomes friends with the twins, and even falls in love with Bingo, who brought out his sensitive side. When she was frozen, Oscar even cried, and was determined to save her.

Max (voiced by Terry McGurrin in English) is Oscar's food obsessed camera man. When he and Oscar were children, Oscar found him floating in the sea, and saved his life. Max forgot where he came from, and became Oscar's best friend. Later on in the series, Max finds out that he was born on the center island where Yani lives. Max is also the warrior of the Yum Yum-Bean, and is the strongest member of the team, along with Congo.

Yani: Yani is a little fairy who looks like a toddler. She floats around in a pink bubble, and is the tribe leader of the center island, where Max was born. She is hurt by pollution and destruction of the center island forest, which made her bubble turn dark. In the final episode, the Wisdom Tree in the center of the planet died, and Yani's bubble faded, and she collapsed, nearly dying. When the tree was healed, Yani's bubble reappeared, and she woke up. Yani is the warrior of the Zen-Bean, and always has to talk sense into Oscar.

Bingo: (voiced by Susan Roman in English) Bingo is a small but tough little panda, who will always fight her way out of a situation. She is an experienced athlete, and cares for her twin brother Congo. She also has feelings for Oscar, which she'll rarely admit. Bingo is a warrior of the Powerup-Bean, along with Congo. In the episode "Panda's On Ice", Bingo is frozen solid after pushing Congo out of the way of a cursed icicle. As she froze, she calmly told her friends to not touch the ice. She told Oscar to be careful, and to take care of Congo, which shows her growing friendship with the other warriors. Bingo and Oscar came close to kissing in the episode "What Lies Bean-neath".

Congo: Congo is Bingo's twin brother, though he is much larger and older than her. He is the Powerup-Bean warrior, along with his sister. He cares very much about her, and will fight anybody to protect her. Congo will often carry her around. He is an experienced athlete, and doesn't trust the other warriors in the beginning.

King Audie (voiced in English by Bill Colgate) is the evil king trying to destroy Pandasia. He lives in the Dark Castle, and uses the Desira-Bean to assist him. He created Galoo. When Cool became King Kulu, Audie was turned into a miniature toddler by him. In the last episode, he returned, but was finally killed by Toby and Cool.

Galoo (voiced in English by Peter Cugno) is an evil pterodactyl/bat monster that King Audie made out of clay. He is the smartest of King Audie's minions, and is often attacking the Bean Warriors and tormenting Gold and Silver. Since he was made out of clay, the King Audie/Plant Monster ate him to gain energy.

Gold (voiced in English by Dwayne Hill) and Silver (voiced in English by Jamie Watson) are King Audie's other two minions. They are brothers, who often mess up. They are both generally cowards, and joined the good side later in the final episodes. Gold is tough and masculine, while his brother Silver is often girly.
 
King Kulu The Evil Motocross Super Funk of the Universe.

Theme song 

 Opening theme: 楽しいこと考えよう
 Lyrics / Composition / Song - EPO  
 Arrangement - 野見祐二
 Ending theme: Friends
 Lyrics / Composition / Song - EPO 
 Arrangement - LONESOME STRINGS

Episodes
The Japanese broadcasts ran from 8 January 2005 to 9 July 2005.

Cast

Promotions
22 November 2004 the Taiwan Post Office released 3500 stamps based on the television show.

From 13 December 2004 to 30 January 2005, TTV hosted 7 prized quiz games, with prizes given to winners correctly answering all 15 questions within 30 seconds. A second series of quiz games were held from 11 July to 8 August during 2005.

TVbean held a lucky draw of 200 museum tickets from 23 September to 5 October during 2005.

Novels
Novel version of Pandalian was authored by Mami Watanabe, published by JIVE in June 2005.

References

External links
PandaLand.Com.Tv the official Chinese Pandalian page
TVbean official site
TTW Pandalian page
Tokyo MXTV Pandalian page
Nelvana's announcement of Pandalian on AnimeNewsNetwork

Funimation
Japanese children's animated action television series
Fictional pandas
Television series about pandas
Television series by Nelvana